The Women's 10 metre air rifle event at the 2008 Olympic Games took place on August 9 at the Beijing Shooting Range Hall. It was the first medal awarded at the 2008 Olympic Games. Kateřina Emmons, who won a bronze medal in Athens four years earlier (then known by her maiden name Kůrková), now went all the way to a gold medal, after becoming the first shooter ever to achieve maximum qualification score (400) in an Olympic air rifle competition.

The event consisted of two rounds: a qualifier and a final. In the qualifier, each shooter fired 40 shots with an air rifle at 10 metres distance from the standing position. Scores for each shot were in increments of 1, with a maximum score of 10.

The top 8 shooters in the qualifying round moved on to the final round. There, they fired an additional 10 shots. These shots scored in increments of .1, with a maximum score of 10.9. The total score from all 50 shots was used to determine final ranking.

Records
Prior to this competition, the existing world and Olympic records were as follows.

During the competition, Kateřina Emmons equalled the world record for the qualification round, setting a new Olympic record of maximum 400 points, and then raised the Olympic final record by 1.5 points to 503.5. Silver medalist Lioubov Galkina also surpassed the old Olympic final record.

Qualification round
The qualification round was held between 08:30 and 09:45 China Standard Time (UTC+8), with all shooters fitting into a single relay. It was the first competition event after the opening ceremony (although some football matches had been played before it).

EWR Equalled world record – OR Olympic record – Q Qualified for final

Final
The final was held at 10:30 China Standard Time (UTC+8), and about 20 minutes later the first medalists of the Games were known.

OR Olympic record

External links
Official results

Shooting at the 2008 Summer Olympics
Olymp
Women's events at the 2008 Summer Olympics